Miss Geraldine Grundy is a fictional character of the Archie Comics series. A younger version of Miss Grundy was portrayed by Sarah Habel in Riverdale.

Fictional history and character
An early version of Miss Grundy appears in Jackpot Comics #4 (Winter 1941).  In this appearance, she is Mrs. Mimi Grundy, the married principal of Riverdale High School.  She is reintroduced as "Miss Grundy" in Pep Comics #30 (April 1942), the no-nonsense homeroom teacher at Riverdale High School, occasionally teaching English and math as well.  Her name is derived from Mrs Grundy, a name that has been used to refer to a prudish woman since the early nineteenth century. Before she became a teacher, she worked at a pickle-packing plant. During World War II, she served with the WACs, outranking Mr. Weatherbee. Despite occasional grumblings from her students, they seem to genuinely like and admire her. She, in return, tends to drive them hard, pushing Archie Andrews and Moose Mason in particular, but remains quite fond of her students.

First name
Her first name is most often given as Geraldine. However, at least once, another staff member called her "Amanda".  She was also called "Alice" in at least one mainstream story.  In Archie's Double Digest (#41), she was revealed to be an alumna herself of Riverdale High School, and had run for class president, in a joke about the need to clean off the bulletin board. Her forename was given as "Elizabeth" in The Archie and Sabrina Hour, as "Geri" in "Archie's Weird Mysteries books, and as "Doris" in the animated series Archie's Weird Mysteries. In one story about Jughead's correct first name, it was revealed as Grisensnable. In an earlier Archie book that listed the names of the characters, her name was also "Gertrude". Nevertheless, Geraldine remains her commonly accepted name.

Alternate versions
In Life with Archie: The Married Life, Miss Grundy and Mr. Weatherbee realized how much they loved each other, and got married. However, in this alternative future, she died from kidney disease not long afterward, leaving Mr. Weatherbee a broken-hearted widower.

In Afterlife with Archie, she and Mr. Weatherbee were chaperoning for the Halloween school dance. They took a break outside to reminisce about the time they snuck into the Cypress Cemetery as children and make references about Night of the Living Dead. Their conversation is cut off at the appearance of a zombified Jughead Jones who mauls Mr. Weatherbee. It is revealed Miss Grundy was turned into a zombie shortly afterwards.
In Chilling Adventures of Sabrina, Miss Grundy is the High Priestess of witch coven that Betty and Veronica are members of. She warned them against summoning a Succubus to deal with their rivalry about Archie.

In other media

Animated 
 Ms. Grundy appears in Archie's Weird Mysteries, where the episode "Twisted Youth" reveals her first name to be Doris, although the tie-in comics refer to her as Geraldine.
 Ms. Grundy is mentioned in the TV film, The Archies in JugMan, where Archie notes that she loves to give pop quizzes.

Live action 
 In Riverdale, Miss Grundy is a much younger woman played by Sarah Habel. In the fourth episode of the series it is revealed that Grundy moved to Riverdale after changing her name from Jennifer Gibson after her divorce, to escape from an abusive relationship. Since then Grundy has moved from Riverdale to avoid police capture because of her relationship with Archie. When Betty is searching for Miss Grundy online, she finds a Miss Grundy who died years prior to the beginning of the series, with her obituary picture closely resembling the Miss Grundy of the comic book series. In the season two premiere, it is revealed she is living in Greendale and "teaching" another young male student, before she is strangled to death by Black Hood with her own cello bow.

References

Archie Comics characters
Fictional schoolteachers
Comics characters introduced in 1941
Fictional World War II veterans
Female characters in animation
Female characters in comics
Female characters in television
Fictional United States Army personnel